Errwood Reservoir is a drinking-water reservoir in the Peak District National Park, within the county of Derbyshire and very close to the boundary with Cheshire. The reservoir was the second of two reservoirs built in the Goyt Valley, the other one being Fernilee Reservoir. It was constructed by the Stockport Water Corporation at a cost of £1.5 million, with work being completed in 1967; it is currently owned and operated by United Utilities. The reservoir provides drinking water for the town of Stockport and its surrounding areas, and it holds  of water.

Errwood Sailing Club uses the reservoir for sailing training/racing, and fishing rights are controlled by Errwood Fly Fishing Club.

The Peak District Boundary Walk runs across Errwood dam and passes above the eastern side of the reservoir.

See also
Errwood Hall

References

External links

 Errwood Sailing Club

Reservoirs of the Peak District
Reservoirs in Derbyshire